Hickenlooper is a surname. Notable people with the surname include:

 Andrew Hickenlooper (1837–1904), American Civil War general and politician
 Bourke B. Hickenlooper (1896–1971), American politician from Iowa
 George Hickenlooper (1963–2010), American documentary filmmaker
 John Hickenlooper (born 1952), American politician from Colorado
 Lucy Mary Agnes Hickenlooper, birth name of American pianist Olga Samaroff (1880–1948)
 Smith Hickenlooper (1880–1933), American judge

See also
 Baca v. Hickenlooper, a case from the United States Court of Appeals for the Tenth Circuit on the constitutionality of laws punishing a faithless elector in the United States Electoral College
 Burns v. Hickenlooper, a lawsuit filed on July 1, 2014, in federal district court in Colorado, challenging that state's denial of marriage rights to same-sex couples